Barysh may refer to:

 Barysh - village in Chortkiv Raion, Ternopil Oblast, Ukraine
 Barysh - town in Russia